Guzmania blassii is a plant species in the genus Guzmania. This species is native to Costa Rica.

Cultivars
 Guzmania 'Morado'
 Guzmania 'Twilight'

References

BSI Cultivar Registry Retrieved 11 October 2009
BSI Journal V33(2), Guzmania blassii, An Attractive New Species from Costa Rica Retrieved 3 October 2011

blassii
Flora of Costa Rica